George Earl is the name of:
George Earl (painter) (1824–1908), English painters
George Earl (cricketer) (1859–1933), English cricketer
George Windsor Earl (1813–1865), English navigator, ethnographer
George Earl (1946–2003), musician, also known as George Faith
George Earl Maney (1826–1901), American soldier, politician, railroad executive and diplomat
George Earl Ortman (1926–2015), American painter, printmaker, constructionist and sculptor

See also
George Earle (disambiguation)